This is a list of viceroys in Jamaica from its initial occupation by Spain in 1509, to its independence from the United Kingdom in 1962. For a list of viceroys after independence, see Governor-General of Jamaica. For context, see History of Jamaica.

Spanish Governors of Santiago (1510–1660)
Jamaica was claimed for Spain in 1494 when Christopher Columbus first landed on the island.  Spain began occupying the island in 1509, naming it Santiago.  The second governor, Francisco de Garay, established Villa de la Vega, now known as Spanish Town, as his capital.

 Juan de Esquivel, 1510–1514
 Francisco de Garay, 1514–1523
 Pedro de Mazuelo, 1523–1526
 Juan de Mendegurren, 1526–1527
 Santino de Raza, 1527–1531
 Gonzalo de Guzman, ?–1532
 Manuel de Rojas, 1532–?, first time
 Gil González Dávila, 1533?–1534?
 Manuel de Rojas, 1536–?, second time
 Pedro Cano, 1539?, first time
 Francisco de Pina, 1544?
 Juan González de Hinojosa, 1556?
 Pedro Cano, 1558?, second time
 Blas de Melo, 1565?
 Juan de Gaudiel, 1567?–1572?
 Hernán Manrique de Rojas, 1575?
 Iñigo Fuentes, ?–1577
 Rodrigo Núñez de la Peña, 1577–1578
 Lucas del Valle Alvarado, 1578–1583?, first time
 Diego Fernández de Mercado, 1586?
 Lucas del Valle Alvarado, 1591?, second time
 García del Valle, 1596?
 Fernando Melgarejo Córdoba, 1596–1606
 Alonso de Miranda, 1607–1611
 Pedro Espejo Barranco, 1611–1614
 Andrés González de Vera, 1614–?
 Sebastián Lorenzo Romano, 1620?
 Francisco Terril, 1625–1632
 Juan Martínez Arana, 1632–1637
 Gabriel Peñalver Angulo, 1637–1639
 Jacinto Sedeño Albornoz, 1639–1640, first time
 Francisco Ladrón de Zegama, 1640–1643
 Alcades, 1643–1645
 Sebastián Fernández de Gamboa, 1645–1646
 Pedro Caballero, 1646–1650
 Jacinto Sedeño Albornoz, 1650, second time
 Francisco de Proenza, 1650–1651, first time
 Juan Ramírez de Arellano, 1651–1655
 Francisco de Proenza, 1655–1656, second time
 Cristóbal Arnaldo Isasi, 1656–1660

English Commanders of Jamaica (1655–61)
In 1655, an English force led by Admiral Sir William Penn, and General Robert Venables seized the island. Following their departure, the incumbents successfully held it against Spanish attempts to retake it over the next few years.

 Admiral Sir William Penn 11 May 1655 – 1655
 General Robert Venables, 1655
 Edward D'Oyley, 1655–1656, first time
 William Brayne, 1656–1657
 Edward D'Oyley, 1657–1661, second time

English Governors of Jamaica (1661–62)
In 1661, England began colonisation of the island.

 Edward D'Oyley, 1661–August 1662, continued
 Thomas, Lord Windsor, August 1662–November 1662

Deputy Governors of Jamaica (1662–71)
 Charles Lyttleton, 1662–1663, acting
 Thomas Lynch, 1663–1664, acting, first time
 Edward Morgan, 1664
 Sir Thomas Modyford, 1664–August 1671

Lieutenant Governors of Jamaica (1671–90)
In 1670, the Treaty of Madrid legitimised English claim to the island.

 Sir Thomas Lynch, August 1671–November 1674, second time
 Sir Henry Morgan, 1674–1675, acting, first time
 John Vaughan, 1675–1678
 Sir Henry Morgan, 1678, acting, second time
 The Earl of Carlisle, 1678–1680
 Sir Henry Morgan, 1680–1682, acting, third time
 Sir Thomas Lynch, 1682–1684, third time
 Hender Molesworth, 1684–December 1687, acting
 Christopher Monck The Duke of Albemarle, 1687–1688
 Hender Molesworth, 1688–1689, acting
 Francis Watson, 1689–1690, acting

Governors of Jamaica (1690–1962)
 The Earl of Inchiquin, 1690–16 January 1692
 John White, 1691–22 August 1692, acting
 John Bourden, 1692–1693, acting
 Sir William Beeston, March 1693–January 1702, acting to 1699
 William Selwyn, Jan-April 1702 (died in office)
 Peter Beckford, 1702, acting
 Thomas Handasyde, 1702–1711, acting to 1704
 Lord Archibald Hamilton, 1711–1716
 Thomas Pitt, 1716-1717
 Peter Heywood, 1716–1718 
 Sir Nicholas Lawes, 1718–1722
 The Duke of Portland, 1722–4 July 1726
 John Ayscough, 1726–1728, acting, first time
 Robert Hunter, 1728–March 1734
 John Ayscough, 1734–1735, acting, second time
 John Gregory, 1735, acting, first time
 Henry Cunningham, 1735–1736
 John Gregory, 1736–1738, acting, second time
 Edward Trelawny, 1738–1752
 Charles Knowles, 1752–January 1756
 Sir Henry Moore, February 1756–April 1756, acting, first time
 George Haldane, April 1756–November 1759
 Sir Henry Moore, November 1759 – 1762, acting, second time
 Sir William Lyttleton, 1762–1766
 Roger Hope Elletson, 1766–1767
 Sir William Trelawny, 1767–December 1772
 John Dalling, December 1772 – 1774, acting, first time
 Sir Basil Keith, 1774–1777
 John Dalling, 1777–1781, second time
 Archibald Campbell, 1781–1784, acting to 1783
 Alured Clarke, 1784–1790
 The Earl of Effingham, 1790–19 November 1791
 Sir Adam Williamson, 1791–1795, acting
 The Earl of Balcarres, 1795–1801
 Sir George Nugent, 1801–1805
 Sir Eyre Coote, 1806–1808
 The Duke of Manchester, 1808–1827
 Sir John Keane, 1827–1829, acting
 The Earl Belmore, 1829–1832
 George Cuthbert, 1832, acting, first time
 The Earl of Mulgrave, 1832–1834
 Sir Amos Norcott, 1834, acting
 George Cuthbert, 1834, acting, second time
 The Marquess of Sligo, 1834–1836
 Sir Lionel Smith, 1836–1839
 Sir Charles Theophilus Metcalfe, 1839–1842
 The Earl of Elgin, 1842–1846
 George Henry Frederick Berkeley, 1846–1847, acting
 Sir Charles Edward Grey, 1847–1853
 Sir Henry Barkly, 1853–1856
 Edward Wells Bell, 1856–1857, acting
 Charles Henry Darling, 1857–1862
 Edward John Eyre, 1862–1865, acting to 1864
 Sir Henry Knight Storks, 12 December 1865 – 16 July 1866
 Sir John Peter Grant, 1866–1874
 W. A. G. Young, 1874, acting
 Sir William Grey, 1874–January 1877
 Edward Rushworth, January 1877, acting
 Sir Anthony Musgrave, January 1877 – 1883
 Somerset M. Wiseman Clarke, 1883, acting
 Dominic Jacotin Gamble, 1883, acting
 Sir Henry Wylie Norman, 1883–1889
 William Clive Justice, 1889, acting
 Sir Henry Arthur Blake, 1889–1898
 Henry Jardine Hallowes, 1898, acting
 Sir Augustus William Lawson Hemming, 1898–1904
 Sydney Haldane Olivier, 1904, acting, first time
 Hugh Clarence Bourne, 1904, acting, first time
 Sir James Alexander Swettenham, 30 September 1904 – 1907
 Hugh Clarence Bourne, 1907, acting, second time
 Sydney Haldane Olivier, 16 May 1907 – January 1913, acting
 Philip Clark Cork, January 1913 – 7 March 1913, acting
 Sir William Henry Manning, 7 March 1913 – 11 May 1918
 Robert Johnstone, 11 May 1918 – 11 June 1918, acting
 Sir Leslie Probyn, 11 June 1918 – 1924
 Herbert Bryan, 1924, acting, first time
 Sir Samuel Herbert Wilson, 29 September 1924 – June 1925
 Sir Herbert Bryan, 1925, acting, second time
 Sir Arthur S. Jelf, October 1925 – 26 April 1926, acting, first time
 Sir Reginald Edward Stubbs, 26 April 1926 – 9 November 1932
 Sir Arthur S. Jelf, 9 November 1932 – 21 November 1932, acting, second time
 Sir Alexander Ransford Slater, 21 November 1932 – April 1934
 Sir Arthur S. Jelf, April 1934–24 October 1934, acting, third time
 Sir Edward Brandis Denham, 24 October 1934 – 2 June 1938
 Charles Campbell Woolley, 2 June 1938 – 19 August 1938, acting
 Sir Arthur Frederick Richards, 19 August 1938 – July 1943
 William Henry Flinn, July 1943 – 29 September 1943, acting
 Sir John Huggins, 29 September 1943 – 7 April 1951
 Sir Hugh Mackintosh Foot, 7 April 1951 – 18 November 1957
 Sir Kenneth Blackburne, 18 December 1957 – 6 August 1962

In 1962, Jamaica gained independence from the United Kingdom.  Since independence, the viceroy in Jamaica has been the Governor-General of Jamaica.

See also

References

Bibliography

http://www.rulers.org/ruljk.html
http://www.worldstatesmen.org/Jamaica.htm

Governors
Government of Jamaica
 
Jamaica
16th century in the Spanish West Indies
17th century in the Spanish West Indies
17th century in the Caribbean
18th century in the Caribbean
19th century in the Caribbean
20th century in the Caribbean
Governors